Poplar Bluff High School is a public high school in Poplar Bluff, Missouri, United States. It is a part of the Poplar Bluff R-1 School District.

Athletics 
The following sports are offered at Poplar Bluff:

 Archery
 Baseball
 Basketball
 Cross country
 Football
 Golf
 Soccer
 Softball
 Swimming and diving
 Target shooting
 Tennis
 Track and field
 Volleyball
 Wrestling

Notable alumni
Ben Hansbrough – former NBA player
Tyler Hansbrough – former NBA player, 2009 NCAA champion with North Carolina
Gayle Kingery – former member of the Missouri House of Representatives
Kameron Misner – professional baseball player in the Tampa Bay Rays organization
Derland Moore – former NFL defensive lineman

References

External links
 

Public high schools in Missouri